Xylander may refer to:

 Emil Ritter und Edler von Xylander (1835–1910), Bavarian general
 Wilhelm Xylander (1532–1576), German classical scholar
 Joseph Ritter und Edler von Xylander (1794–1854), Bavarian general
 Oskar Ritter und Edler von Xylander (1856–1940), Bavarian general
 Wolf-Dietrich Ritter und Edler von Xylander (1903–1945), German general